Bigtop may refer to:
 Circus
 Bigtop, a distributed operating system project from Microsoft Research